SQE may refer to:

San Luis de Palenque Airport, Colombia, IATA airport code
Solicitors Qualifying Examination, the equivalent of the bar examination for solicitors in England and Wales
Surrey Quays railway station, London, National Rail station code
 Supplier Quality Engineer, derived from SQA which are the SQEs focused on. (The abbreviation SQE is sometimes also incorrectly used as "senior quality engineer". If such rank is important other abbreviation should be used.)